Marie Dietrich (26 January 1868 – 14 December 1939) was a German operatic soprano and voice teacher.

Life 
Born in Stuttgart or Weinsberg Dietrich began her vocal studies with Mrs. Bader in Stuttgart and Ferdinand Jäger. Originally she wanted to become a concert singer, but when she heard the then court theatre director at a concert of the commercial association in Göppingen, he invited her to an audition. Thereupon she was engaged for three years at the Hoftheater Stuttgart.

She liked it there, but because she felt that her voice needed further training, she took a three-month vacation in the first year and went to Paris to study with Pauline Viardot-Garcia. As she made good progress, she also went to Paris for a second and third year.

In 1891 she made a guest appearance at the Hofoperntheater in Vienna as "Rosine", "Philine" and "Susanne" with such success that she was offered an engagement. But she decided for the Hofoperntheater Berlin, which had given her a contract at the same time.

She stayed there until 1912 (stage farewell August 1912 as "Marie" in Der Waffenschmied by A. Lortzing). After that she worked as a concert singer and singing teacher.

She was an excellent coloratura singer, whose technical skill was especially praised, as well as the sparkling light fluid of her passages and fioritura. The voice, a modulation-capable soprano of considerable size, was characterized by an incredibly sympathetically touching timbre and a fresh, melodious sound. Her humorous roles were particularly good.

Marie Dietrich died in 1939 in Berlin at age 71. On which exactly, is not known.<ref>Hans-Jürgen Mende: Lexikon Berliner Begräbnisstätten on Google Books</ref>

 Recording 
 J. Strauss's: Die Fledermaus, with Willy Domgraf-Fassbaender, Margret Pfahl, Adele Kern; conductor: Hermann Weigert, Orchester der Staatsoper Berlin, 1929

 References 

 Further reading 
 Ludwig Eisenberg: Großes biographisches Lexikon der Deutschen Bühne im XIX. Jahrhundert. Paul List publishing house, Leipzig 1903,.
 Wilhelm Kosch: Deutsches Theater-Lexikon, Biographisches und bibliographisches Handbuch'', first volume, Klagenfurt and Vienna 1953, 
 Mary Dietrich als Nonne, Rollenbild, Hüftbild, in: Engelbert Humperdinck: Das Mirakel on Google Books

External links 
 Dietrich Marie on OPERISSIMO
 
 Marie Dietrich at forgottenopersinger.blogspot.de
 Dietrich's performances at the Wienna Staatsoper

German operatic sopranos
Voice teachers
1868 births
1939 deaths
Musicians from Stuttgart